Duncan is a ghost town in Milam County, Texas,  northwest of Rockdale near Alligator Creek. The area was settled in 1879, and George and Elizabeth Duncan donated land to build a two-teacher school in 1892. The school was consolidated with Sharp ISD by the 1930s, and the only landmark there today is a small community center.

References

Ghost towns in Milam County, Texas
Ghost towns in Central Texas